OCAM may refer to:

 Organization Commune Africaine et Malgache, a former organization in Africa
 YM Oceanic Culture and Art Museum, a museum in Kaohsiung, Taiwan